Andrea Francolisio d'Aquino (1639–1715) was a Roman Catholic prelate who served as Bishop of Tricarico (1673–1676).

Biography
Andrea Francolisio d'Aquino was born on 29 Jul 1639 in Naples and ordained a priest on 30 Nov 1672.
On 27 Feb 1673, he was appointed during the papacy of Pope Clement X as Bishop of Tricarico.
On 12 Mar 1673, he was consecrated bishop by Gasparo Carpegna, Cardinal-Priest of San Silvestro in Capite, with Alessandro Crescenzi, Titular Patriarch of Alexandria, and Giacinto Libelli, Archbishop of Avignon, serving as co-consecrators. 
He served as Bishop of Tricarico until his resignation on 18 Jun 1676. He died on 23 Mar 1715.

References

External links and additional sources
 (for Chronology of Bishops) 
 (for Chronology of Bishops) 

17th-century Italian Roman Catholic bishops
Bishops appointed by Pope Clement X
1639 births
1715 deaths
17th-century Neapolitan people
18th-century Neapolitan people